Ivan Wells "Tiny" Cahoon (May 22, 1900 – February 3, 1973) was an American football player and coach.  He played professionally as a  tackle for the Green Bay Packers of the National Football League (NFL) from 1926 to 1929. He played college football at the University of Montana and at Gonzaga University.

Biography
Cahoon was born on May 22, 1900, in Baraboo, Wisconsin.  He played college football under head coach Gus Dorais at Gonzaga, and was part of the school's undefeated team in 1924. After graduating from Gonzaga in 1925, Cahoon taught and coached at Libby High School in Montana for a year, then played pro football. He was a tackle for the Green Bay Packers for four seasons from 1926 until 1929, when a knee injury ended his playing career. He coached high school football at West De Pere in Wisconsin while a pro player, moved to Green Bay West High School in 1933, and to Monmouth College in Illinois in 1938.

Cahoon moved to the professional Milwaukee Chiefs, a new team in the American Football League in 1940 and 1941, then entered the United States Army during World War II, and coached football service teams. In 1951, he returned to Gonzaga University as an ROTC instructor.

Head coaching record

College

See also
 List of Green Bay Packers players

References

External links
 
 

1900 births
1973 deaths
American football tackles
Green Bay Packers players
Gonzaga Bulldogs football players
Monmouth Fighting Scots football coaches
Montana Grizzlies football players
High school football coaches in Wisconsin
United States Army personnel of World War II
People from Baraboo, Wisconsin
Players of American football from Wisconsin
Military personnel from Wisconsin